Robat Rural District is a rural district (dehestan) in the Central District of Khorramabad County, Lorestan Province, Iran. At the 2006 census, its population was 8,193, in 1,670 families.  The rural district has 47 villages.

References 

Rural Districts of Lorestan Province
Khorramabad County